Damayanthi is a 2019 Kannada mythological comedy horror film written and directed by Navarasan. The film is also being dubbed into Tamil and Malayalam with the same title and in Telugu language as Samharini.  The film is produced by Sri Lakshmi Vrushadhri Productions and is touted to be a mythological horror-comedy. The horror-comedy thriller set in the 80s, has Radhika, who features in three shades. The film has G. K. Reddy, in a pivotal role, along with Saurav Lokesh (Bhajarangi Loki), Anusha Ravi, Raj Bahadhur, Sadhu Kokila, and Tabla Nani as part of the cast. The movie was reported to be inspired by the 2017 Telugu movie Anando Brahma  and released two weeks after the release of the official remake of the Telugu version Mane Maratakkide.

Cast 

 Radhika Kumaraswamy as Damayanthi
 Saurav Lokesh
 Sharan Ulthi 
 G. K. Reddy as Vijayendra Varma, Damayanthi's father
 Sadhu Kokila
 Tabla Nani
 Bala Rajwadi
 Anjana
 Raj Bahadur
 Naveen Krishna
 S.S.Ravi Gowda
 Honnavalli Krishna
 Kempegowda
 Mithra
 Anusha Rai
 Girish Shivanna
 Pawan
 Karthik
 Veena Sundar

Production 
In an interview with The Times of India, Radhika said that "I'm playing the role of a girl, who comes to the help of the people. This is a double shaded character in the movie. Bajrangi Loki is playing negative shade in the movie. Our scenes have come up very well,".

Shashikala, the famous voice behind Nagavalli’s character featuring Soundarya in Apthamitra, has now dubbed for Radhika Kumaraswamy in this film. The makers conducted voice tests with  23 dubbing artistes, and finally decided to bring Shashikala on board.

“Even Radhika, who usually dubs for her films, felt that she will not be able to do justice with her voice, and then we decided to go with Shashikala. We were told that she has not been working for the last three years. However, she considered our request and completed dubbing for the film. With her voice, the character played by Radhika now reaches another level,” director Navarasan said in an interview with The New Indian Express.

Soundtrack

References

External links 

2019 comedy horror films
Indian comedy horror films
2010s Kannada-language films
2019 films
Kannada remakes of Telugu films